Thomas Alexander Varlan (born July 1, 1956) is a United States district judge of the United States District Court for the Eastern District of Tennessee.

Education and career

Born in Oak Ridge, Tennessee, Varlan received a Bachelor of Arts degree from the University of Tennessee in 1978 and a Juris Doctor from Vanderbilt University School of Law in 1981. He was in private practice in Atlanta, Georgia, from 1981 to 1987. He was the law director for the City of Knoxville, Tennessee, from 1988 to 1998, thereafter returning to private practice in Knoxville from 1998 to 2003.

District court service

On January 7, 2003, Varlan was nominated by President George W. Bush to a seat on the United States District Court for the Eastern District of Tennessee vacated by Robert Leon Jordan. Varlan was confirmed by the United States Senate on March 13, 2003, and received his commission on March 14, 2003. He became Chief Judge on October 8, 2012. His term as Chief Judge ended up March 31, 2019.

Sources

1956 births
Living people
University of Tennessee alumni
Vanderbilt University Law School alumni
Judges of the United States District Court for the Eastern District of Tennessee
United States district court judges appointed by George W. Bush
21st-century American judges
People from Oak Ridge, Tennessee